Reactive dye printing is a method of printing by Reactive dyes paste or wax by using mixture of Sodium alginate Gum, Soda ash, Urea and kerosin thereof to create a paste of colors. after printing of fabrics by this reactive dyes Printing paste , the printed fabrics must be needed heat setting for drying at 130 degree temperature and curing at 180 degree Temperature. by this heating the  Reactive printing paste will be permanently fixed on fabrics. after that the fabrics will need finish with softener for better hand feel.

These reactions are generally heat-activated.

External links
Printing Pigment Paste

Printing Chemicals List details
 US Patent 6,840,614

Dyes